Bezděkov a municipality and village in Rokycany District in the Plzeň Region of the Czech Republic. It has about 200 inhabitants.

Geography
It lies in the Plasy Uplands.

History
The first written mention of Bezděkov is in a deed of King Wenceslaus I of Bohemia from 1234.

Demographics

Transport
Bezděkov is located on the regional railway line leading from Plzeň to Radnice.

The road II/232 connects Bezděkov with Rokycany and Břasy.

References

External links

Villages in Rokycany District